Insnärjd is the second EP by Christian black metal band Admonish. The album's title translates as "Ensnared" or "Entangled". "A Glimpse" and "Legacy" are classical guitar interludes.

Track listing
 "Tower of Strength" - 6:02
 "Istid" - 7:42
 "A Glimpse" - 2:00  
 "Journey Into Afterlife" - 8:29
 "Legacy" - 2:27

Personnel
Martin Norén - vocals
Emanuel Wärja - guitar, vocals
Emil Karlsson - guitar
Jonas Karlsson - bass
Robin Svedman - drums

Additional musicians
Johanna Egenaes - female vocals
Stormvit - keyboards

Production
Torbjön Weinesjö - mixing
Jeff Mortimer - mastering

References

2007 EPs
Admonish (band) albums